Centaure was a two-stage French sounding rocket consisting of a Belier (rocket) starting stage and a Venus upper stage. It was operated by CNES between 1961 and 1986. The Centaure has been built in a number of 230 and has been launched from the CIEES/Hammaguir missile range, Reggane, CELPA, Salto di Quirra, Esrange, Thumba, Sonmiani, and Andøya. It had a maximum payload of 60 kg, a maximum height of 140 km, a launch thrust of 44 kN, a launch weight of 457 kg, a diameter of 0.28 m and a length of 6.02 m. It belongs to a family of solid-propellant rockets consisting of the Belier, Centaure, Dragon, Dauphin, and Eridan rockets.

External links
https://web.archive.org/web/20131019123755/http://www.astronautix.com/lvs/centaure.htm

Sounding rockets of France